The Scranton House is a historic house at 711 Brook Road in Goshen, New Hampshire. Built about 1850, it is one of a cluster of plank-frame houses in Goshen, and is unusual in that group for its use of thinner planking. The house was listed on the National Register of Historic Places in 1985.

Description and history
It is a -story Cape-style wooden structure, with a gabled roof and clapboarded exterior. Windows are sash, and a brick chimney rises against the right side. The house framing consists of planking (1.25 to 1.5-inch vs. a more typical 3-inch found in other Goshen plank-frame houses) oriented vertically, with dowels placed horizontally for lateral stability. A 20th-century two-car garage is attached to the left side at a recess, and the property also includes a horse barn.

The house was built about 1850, and originally was clad in vertical board-and-batten siding, with a relatively fine Greek Revival entrance surround. Both of these features survived into the mid-20th century before their replacement.

See also
National Register of Historic Places listings in Sullivan County, New Hampshire

References

Houses on the National Register of Historic Places in New Hampshire
Houses completed in 1850
Houses in Goshen, New Hampshire
National Register of Historic Places in Sullivan County, New Hampshire